Bergonié tram stop is located on line  of the tramway de Bordeaux.

Location
The station is situated on the courtyard of Argonne in Bordeaux.

Junctions

Close by
 Institut Bergonié

See also
 TBC
 Tramway de Bordeaux

External links
 

Bordeaux tramway stops
Tram stops in Bordeaux
Railway stations in France opened in 2004